Edith Skouras was an American screenwriter who primarily worked in Hollywood in the 1930s.

Biography 
Edith was born in Salt Lake City, Utah, to Charles Skouras and Florence Souders. The family spent time in Missouri, where Charles and his brothers built a theater business and Edith attended Hosmer Hall. After the extended family moved further west, her father eventually became head of Fox West Coast Theaters, which he ran with Edith's uncles. Edith married Jack Jungmeyer Jr., an assistant film producer at 20th Century Fox, in 1938. The pair often collaborated on projects together. She died in Santa Barbara, California, in 2015.

Selected filmography 
Manhattan Heartbeat (1940)
On Their Own (1940)
High School (1940)
Mr. Moto in Danger Island (1939)
Always Goodbye (1938)

References

External links 

Writers from Salt Lake City
American women screenwriters
1911 births
2015 deaths
Screenwriters from Utah
20th-century American screenwriters
20th-century American women writers
21st-century American women